Zenon de Souza Farias (born March 31, 1954) is a Brazilian former football (soccer) player who played for Avaí, Guarani, Corinthians, Atlético Mineiro and Portuguesa. He was born in Tubarão, Santa Catarina.

He was a skilled central midfielder with a great vision of the field, excellent long passes and was one of the best free kick takers in Brazil during the 1980s. He captained Brazil when they lost 2-0 at home to England in 1984.

References

External links

Living people
Brazilian footballers
Brazilian expatriate footballers
Brazil international footballers
1979 Copa América players
Campeonato Brasileiro Série A players
Avaí FC players
Guarani FC players
Al-Ahli Saudi FC players
Saudi Professional League players
Sport Club Corinthians Paulista players
Clube Atlético Mineiro players
Associação Portuguesa de Desportos players
Esporte Clube São Bento players
Expatriate footballers in Saudi Arabia
1954 births
Brazilian expatriate sportspeople in Saudi Arabia
Association football midfielders